The Suzuki CV1 is a microcar first presented at the 24th Tokyo Motor Show in 1981.

Displayed under the banner of Suzuki community vehicle, the CV1 was a single-seat, four-wheeler, with a narrower track at the rear. The vehicle could be driven on a moped licence in Japan and was sold in very limited numbers on a trial basis at a price of 300,000 Yen. The car had windows on either side that could be slid upwards and early versions had a single headlamp. Production ended in 1985 when Japanese licensing laws were changed.

Sources

External links
 The cars on display at the Tokyo Motor Show

Microcars
CV1
Cars of Japan
Cars introduced in 1981
Cars discontinued in 1985